Best and Most Beautiful Things is a 2016 documentary film directed by Garrett Zevgetis and produced by Zevgetis, Ariana Garfinkel, Jeff Consiglio, and Jordan Salvatoriello. It follows Michelle Smith, a young woman transitioning into adulthood while dealing with the additional challenges associated with disability.

Synopsis
The film explores the coming of age of an exuberant and precocious young blind woman, Michelle Smith, who identifies as being on the autism spectrum. As she tries various ways of finding her true self in a new world of adults, she struggles with family tensions and trying to keep a job. On a more personal level, she begins developing a sense of sexual identity through exploring aspects of fetishism.

Critical reception
In a December 1, 2016 review in The New York Times, Neil Genzlinger called the film "a remarkably forthright documentary" in which Ms. Smith makes "a difficult transition for someone with disabilities - the end of the schooling years, with their structure and relative safety." The same review named the film a New York Times "Critics' Pick."

Awards
 Won Special Jury Award for Individuality of the Human Spirit at the 2016 Florida Film Festival.
 Won Special Jury Prize for Best Documentary Feature at the 2016 Independent Film Festival of Boston.
 Nominated for Jury Award for Best Documentary Feature at the 2016 South by Southwest film festival.

References

External links 
Best and Most Beautiful Things film web site
IMDb

2016 films
Documentary films about people with disability
2010s English-language films
Films about disability